Reynold Banigo (born 13 August 1998) is an English athlete specialising in the long jump.

He became British champion when winning the long jump event at the 2020 British Athletics Championships with a jump of 7.81 metres.

References

Living people
1998 births
English male long jumpers
British male long jumpers
British Athletics Championships winners